Dr. Marius Jan "Just" Göbel (November 21, 1891 in Surabaya – March 5, 1984 in Ede) was a Dutch amateur football (soccer) player.

Career

Göbel who played for Vitesse Arnhem, succeeded Reinier Beeuwkes as the Dutch national goalkeeper in 1911. He was known for being the first Dutch keeper trying to catch the ball rather than stomp it away. He played 18 matches for the Dutch team, being best remembered for his numerous saves during the 2-1 win over England's amateurs and his bronze medal in the football tournament of the 1912 Summer Olympics.

During the First World War, he studied medicine.  The West Stand at Vitesse's GelreDome was named in his honour in 2016.

References

External links

 

1891 births
1984 deaths
Dutch footballers
Association football goalkeepers
SBV Vitesse players
Footballers at the 1912 Summer Olympics
Olympic footballers of the Netherlands
Olympic bronze medalists for the Netherlands
Netherlands international footballers
Dutch military doctors
Sportspeople from Surabaya
Olympic medalists in football
Medalists at the 1912 Summer Olympics
Dutch people of the Dutch East Indies